Aqa Moqim Mahalleh (also Romanized as Āqā Moqīm Maḩalleh; also known as Āqā Mogīm Maḩalleh) is a village in Goli Jan Rural District, in the Central District of Tonekabon County, Mazandaran Province, Iran. At the 2006 census, its population was 136, in 40 families.

References 

Populated places in Tonekabon County